Martin Falch is an Austrian para-alpine skier. He represented Austria in four Winter Paralympics: in 2002, 2006, 2010 and 2014.

He won the bronze medal in the Men's Slalom LW4 event at the 2002 Winter Paralympics.

He also represented Austria in the Slalom event and the Giant slalom event at the 2011 IPC Alpine Skiing World Championships. He did not win a medal in either event.

See also 
 List of Paralympic medalists in alpine skiing

References 

Living people
Year of birth missing (living people)
Place of birth missing (living people)
Paralympic alpine skiers of Austria
Alpine skiers at the 2002 Winter Paralympics
Alpine skiers at the 2006 Winter Paralympics
Alpine skiers at the 2010 Winter Paralympics
Alpine skiers at the 2014 Winter Paralympics
Medalists at the 2002 Winter Paralympics
Paralympic bronze medalists for Austria
Paralympic medalists in alpine skiing
21st-century Austrian people